Nodari Otarievich Maisuradze (born 18 February 1988) is a Russian pair skater. With Julia Antipova, he is the 2014 Bavarian Open champion and placed eighth at the 2014 World Championships. 

With former partner Lubov Iliushechkina, Maisuradze is the 2010 Skate Canada champion, 2011 Winter Universiade champion, 2009 World Junior champion, 2008 World Junior silver medalist, and 2009 Russian national bronze medalist.

Personal life 
Nodari Otarievich Maisuradze was born 18 February 1988 in Lipetsk, Russian SFSR, Soviet Union. He moved to Saint Petersburg when he was 12. On 9 July 2020 he married Russian pair skater Alina Ustimkina.

Career

Early years 
Maisuradze began skating at the age of three-and-a-half in Lipetsk. His first coach was Galina Sukhareva. He began training in Saint Petersburg at age 12 and was taught by Alexei Urmanov for a year.

Partnership with Iliushechkina 
In April 2006, Maisuradze switched from singles to pairs, teaming up with Lubov Iliushechkina. Though initially skeptical, coach Natalia Pavlova decided to work with them because she had no pairs at the time and grew impressed by their commitment. In September of that year, Pavlova moved to Moscow and the pair followed her. 

During the 2007–08 season, Iliushechkina/Maisuradze took silver at the 2008 Junior Worlds and placed 4th at the senior Russian Nationals. 

During the 2008–09 season, they won the World Junior title, along with gold at the Junior Grand Prix Final. The pair also competed at the senior level, winning the bronze at Russian Nationals and placing 5th at their first European Championships. They earned a berth to 2009 Worlds but were forced to withdraw due to an injury to Maisuradze. He injured ligaments in his hand in a skiing accident. They were replaced by Ksenia Ozerova and Alexander Enbert. 

During the 2009–10 season, Iliushechkina/Maisuradze placed third in the short program at 2009 Cup of China and achieved their personal best score of 62.54. However, they struggled in the long program, finishing seventh in that segment, and fifth overall. At Russian Nationals, they also struggled and finished in fourth. After the difficult season, they made some adjustments in training. 

Iliushechkina/Maisuradze began the 2010–11 season by capturing the gold at 2010 Skate Canada, their first medal on the senior Grand Prix circuit. Only a week later, they competed at the 2010 Cup of China and placed 4th. Their results qualified them for their first Grand Prix Final at the senior level. They finished fourth, setting new personal bests in the long program (117.38) and combined total (177.44). At the 2011 Russian Nationals, they placed sixth in the short program and fourth in the long, to finish fifth overall. They were named to the 2011 Winter Universiade team but missed the European and World teams. Iliushechkina/Maisuradze won the gold medal at the Winter Universiade.

In the 2011–12 season, Iliushechkina/Maisuradze competed at 2011 Skate Canada, where they placed 5th, and 2011 NHK Trophy, where they finished 6th. They were 6th at the 2012 Russian Championships. In March 2012, their coach, Natalia Pavlova, confirmed that their partnership had ended.

Partnership with Antipova 
Maisuradze began training with Julia Antipova in July 2012. They placed fourth at the 2013 Russian Championships and then won silver in their international debut at the 2013 Bavarian Open. Natalia Pavlova and Artur Dmitriev jointly coached the pair in their first season together.

In the summer of 2013, Antipova/Maisuradze lost some training time due to injury and their search for a new coaching situation. The Russian federation having decided they would stay in the short term with Dmitriev, the pair returned to training in early August, working with Dmitriev separately from his and Pavlova's main group. Antipova/Maisuradze placed fifth at their sole Grand Prix assignment, the 2013 Rostelecom Cup. In the free skate, they executed a quadruple twist, their first in competition. After placing fourth again at the Russian Championships, the pair won their first international, the 2014 Bavarian Open, and were assigned to the 2014 World Championships after Tatiana Volosozhar / Maxim Trankov decided to miss the event. Making their World debut, the pair finished eighth in Saitama, Japan. 

Antipova/Maisuradze decided to remain with Dmitriev in the 2014–15 season. They were chosen to compete at the 2014 Cup of China and 2014 NHK Trophy.

Programs

With Antipova

With Iliushechkina

Competitive highlights 
GP: Grand Prix; JGP: Junior Grand Prix

With Antipova

With Iliushechkina

References

External links 

 
 

Russian male pair skaters
1988 births
Living people
Sportspeople from Lipetsk
Russian sportspeople of Georgian descent
World Junior Figure Skating Championships medalists
Universiade medalists in figure skating
Universiade gold medalists for Russia
Competitors at the 2011 Winter Universiade